Joseph Braithwaite may refer to:
Joseph Gurney Braithwaite (1895–1958), British politician
Joseph Braithwaite (mayor) (1848–1917), mayor of Dunedin, New Zealand
Joseph Bevan Braithwaite (1818–1905), English Quaker minister
Joseph Bevan Braithwaite (stockbroker) (1855–1934), English stockbroker and Quaker